Dmitri Stajila (born 2 August 1991) is a Moldovan football goalkeeper who plays for German NOFV-Oberliga Nord club Rostocker FC. Over two meters tall, he also holds Russian citizenship as Dmitri Igorevich Stazhila.

Club career

Kuban Krasnodar
On 19 February 2016, he signed a 3-year contract with the Russian side FC Kuban Krasnodar.

Honours
Sheriff Tiraspol	

 Moldovan National Division (4) : 2009–10,2011–12,2012–13,2013–14
Moldovan Cup (1) : 2009-10
 Runner-Up (1) : 2013-14
Moldovan Super Cup (1) : 2013

Individual
Most Clean Sheets (1) : Season 2013–14 = 17 matches without goal

References

External links

Dmitri Stajila at Sheriff website
Dmitri Stajila at UEFA.com

1991 births
People from Tiraspol
Living people
Moldovan footballers
Moldova youth international footballers
Association football goalkeepers
FC Sheriff Tiraspol players
FC Dinamo-Auto Tiraspol players
FK Kukësi players
FC Kuban Krasnodar players
FC Mashuk-KMV Pyatigorsk players
Al-Mujazzal Club players
KF Laçi players
Berliner FC Dynamo players
Moldovan Super Liga players
Kategoria Superiore players
Russian Premier League players
Russian First League players
Russian Second League players
Saudi First Division League players
Regionalliga players
Oberliga (football) players
Moldovan expatriate footballers
Expatriate footballers in Albania
Moldovan expatriate sportspeople in Albania
Expatriate footballers in Russia
Moldovan expatriate sportspeople in Russia
Expatriate footballers in Saudi Arabia
Moldovan expatriate sportspeople in Saudi Arabia
Expatriate footballers in Germany
Moldovan expatriate sportspeople in Germany